The 1898–99 St Helens R.F.C. season was the club's fourth in the Northern Rugby Football Union, the 25th in their history. The club finished 8th out of 14 in the Lancashire League. In the Challenge Cup, St Helens were beaten in the third round by Salford.

Lancashire Senior Championship

Swinton had 2 points deducted for a breach of the professional rules.

References

St Helens R.F.C. seasons
1898 in English rugby league
1899 in English rugby league